The history of Dedham, Massachusetts from 2000 to present includes several large commercial and residential developments, the Town's 375th anniversary, municipal building projects, and changes to the Charter.

Development
Major developments in Dedham include the Jewish Rashi School, a $30 million building on the 162-acre campus of Hebrew SeniorLife's NewBridge on the Charles in the fall of 2010.   The 82,000-square-foot LEED-certified school opened in the fall of 2010 with 300 students in kindergarten through eighth grade and room to grow the population.  The first of the 700 residents of NewBridge on the Charles moved in on June 1, 2010.

After Legacy Place, a shopping mall with 80 stores, restaurants, and a 15-screen movie theater opened, businesses in Dedham Square suffered.  Legacy Place opened in 2009, with the first movie being shown to the public on August 27, 2009.  The first film was Inglourious Basterds, and the first preview was for Shutter Island, a movie partially filmed in Dedham.

There are police substations at NewBridge and at Legacy Place.

In the early years of the century, the 103' water pipe that stood on Walnut Street across from Oakdale Avenue was torn down to make room for a new house. At the time, it was the oldest steel water tank in the country, having stood since 1881.

Municipal building projects

Schools
Town Meeting created a School Building/ Rehabilitation Committee (SBRC) in 2000.  In 2006 the new Dedham Middle School was opened next door to the existing Dedham Middle School, which previously served as Dedham High School from 1915 to 1959.  The  Certified Green School cost $22,353,209. They 1847 Charles and Mary Shaw House, which was then being used as the school administration's offices, had to be razed to make room for it.

In 2012 a new  Avery Elementary School was opened at a cost of $19,285,949.  Like, the Middle School, it was designed by the firm of Dore and Whittier.  In 2015 the SBRC was considering where to build a new Early Childhood Education Center.

The 2016 Annual Town Meeting spent two hours debating the construction of a new, stand-alone Early Childhood Education Center at the Dexter School.  Despite a split vote of the School Building/ Rehabilitation Committee, and only one of the nine members of the Finance and Warrant Committee speaking in favor of it, the $18.9 million proposal passed with broad support.  It will be the first pre-school and kindergarten facility in the state financed with money from the state.

Town Hall and Senior Center

Town Meeting rejected a $40 million proposal in November 2014 to buy a  portion of the former Rust Craft Greeting Card building at 100 Rustcraft Road for use as a Town Hall, Senior Center, and Police Station.  The Town had already spent hundreds of thousands of dollars in due diligence when Town Meeting rejected the plan.

At the 2014 Annual Town Meeting it was voted instead to purchase the  Ames Schoolhouse for $5.85 million and renovate it to be used as a Town Hall and Senior Center.  An additional $1 million was appropriated to relocate the tenants of the schoolhouse, which was listed on the National Register of Historic Places in 1983.  Town Meeting Representatives and other supporters of a Senior Center, a building discussed and debated for more than 30 years, "wooed and applauded loudly," and were dancing in the aisles after the article passed.

The price to renovate the building ballooned from $10.6 million to $14.1 million after a more thorough inspection of the building was conducted.  On June 19 and 20, 2020, most departments moved from the old town hall into the Ames Schoolhouse.

Public safety building
After most of the Town's administrative offices move into the Ames Schoolhouse, the Police Department was expected to renovate the old Town Hall for their use at a cost of $9.5 million.  Plans changed, however, to knocking down the existing Town Hall and instead building a combined public safety building for both the police and fire departments. 

On March 5, 2021, a ceremonial groundbreaking took place for the new building. The new building at 26 Bryant Street was opened for the first time on March 12, 2023. The public was invited to take tours following the ribbon cutting. The Dedham Square Planning Committee voted to recommend the old police headquarters be demolished and a new town green be built on the site in December 2021. A six-person working group was created to oversee the project in April 2022.

Other

On November 9, 2020, the Town of Dedham renamed a 1.3 acre park as the William B. Gould Memorial Park. The park was formally dedicated on September 23, 2021 before a crowd of more than 100. The park on Mother Brook is about .5 miles from Gould's home on Milton Street. A committee was established to erect a sculpture of him on the site by Memorial Day 2023, the 100th anniversary of Gould's death. The names of four finalists, all artists of color, were announced at the dedication.

Government

Charter changes
In March 2012 the Board of Selectmen created a Charter Advisory Committee to review the Town's governing document and to recommend changes.  The committee consisted of Thomas R. Polito, Jr., Joseph Pascarella, Kevin Mawe, Jay Donahue, Brian Keaney, Cherylann Sheehan, and Camille Zahka, and met more than 25 times before presenting their findings to the Selectmen in August 2013. The Selectmen sent the recommendations on to Town Meeting, who presented them to Town Meeting.  The Town Meeting approved all but one, calling for term limits.  At the 2014 Town Election, voters approved five of the six amendments, with the only exception being an increase in the term of the Town Clerk from three to five years.

In 2020 a new Charter Committee was appointed. It included Chairman Carmen Dello Iacono, Michelle Apuzzio, Gemma Martin, Andrew Haley, Lance Hartford, Michele Heffernan, and Tom Ryan.

Select Board elections

2022
Two seats for three year terms available.

2021
One seat for a full three year term available.

2020
Two seats for three year terms available.

2019
Two seats for three year terms available.

2018
One seat for a full three year term available.

2017
Two seats for three year terms available.

2016
Two seats for three year terms available.

2015
One seat for a full three-year term available.

A separate election was called for when Carmen Dello Iacono stepped down as Selectman to becoming the Town's electrical inspector.

2014
Two seats for full three year terms were available.

2013
Two seats for full three year terms were available.

2012
One seat for a full three-year term available.

2011
Two seats for full three year terms were available.

2010
Two seats for full three year terms were available.

2009
One seat for a full three-year term was available.

2008
Two seats for full three year terms were available.

2007
Two seats for full three year terms were available.

Representation in the General Court

375th Anniversary
In 2011 the Town of Dedham celebrated its 375 anniversary.  A steering committee was appointed by the Selectmen to coordinate a year's worth of activities marking the occasion.  The Committee was composed of Marie-Louise Kehoe, Donna Greer, Nancy Baker, Mayanne Brigss, Dan Hart, Michele Heffernan, Joan Jolley, Brian Keaney, Vicky Kruckeberg, and Sarah MacDonald, with Kehoe and Greer serving as co-chairs.  In September, the same month the Town was incorporated by the Great and General Court, a 375th Birthday Party was held at the Endicott Estate with over 7,500 people attending.  The food, rides, games, and trolley tours were free for Dedham residents, and non residents paid $5 a person or $20 for a family.

Other events included a cocktail party at the Endicott Estate, an Ecumenical Church Service where each congregation gave their history, an essay contest for schoolchildren, and more.

Awards and honors
Dedham Middle School Principal Debra Gatley was named the Massachusetts Secondary School Administrators' Association Principal of the Year in 2015.

In 2012 the Town Meeting created the Public Service Recognition Committee to recognize citizens who have performed outstanding acts of service to the community.  In 2013 Don Gosselin was recognized before the Annual Town Meeting, and in 2014 Amy Black won the adult award and Caroline Bell won the youth award.  In 2015 the winner was Bill Podolski.

Athletics
In 2015, Declan Harris won the Massachusetts Interscholastic Athletic Association's state wrestling championship at the 145 pound weight class, and Eric Reyes won at the 160 pound weight class.  Reyes had won at 145 pounds in 2014, and at 126 pounds in 2013.

Commemorating its 30th year, the James Joyce Ramble in 2013, 2014 and 2015  was the host for the USA Track & Field National Masters 10K Championship. It was canceled in 2020 and 2021 due to COVID-19.

In 2007, the Dedham High School Marauders changed their logo from a Native American to a pirate.  In 2015 discussions began about changing the logo again.

Free Little Libraries
Beginning in 2013, the Dedham Library Innovation Team began installing Little Free Libraries around Dedham. In 2021, a grant from the Dedham Cultural Council enabled a restoration and maintenance plan to be implemented by Sal D'Antonia.

Flag Day Parade
The 48th annual Flag Day Parade, one of Dedham's most beloved traditions, was held on June 14, 2015 with honorary Grand Marshall Bob Aldous. In 2017, for the 50th anniversary, the parade was moved from the traditional June 14, Flag Day, to Saturday, June 17 to accommodate the fireworks at Memorial Park that were part of the celebration.

Notes

References

Works cited

21st century in Massachusetts